The acronym PPAC may refer to:

 Providence Performing Arts Center, multi-use theatre in Providence, Rhode Island
 People With Parkinson's Advisory Council, a committee of people with Parkinson's Disease
 Philipsburgh Performing Arts Center, former name of the Philipsburgh Building in Yonkers, New York.
  Patent Protection Association of China, a Chinese intellectual property rights organization